Currant Mountain is the highest mountain in the White Pine Range in White Pine County, Nevada, United States. It is the twenty-first-highest mountain in the state, and also ranks as the sixteenth-most topographically prominent peak in the state. To the west are the Duckwater (Shoshone) tribal lands and the northern arm of large Railroad Valley. To the east is the northern part of White River Valley.

References

External links 
 
 

Mountains of White Pine County, Nevada
Mountains of Nevada
Humboldt–Toiyabe National Forest